Curt Allen Byrum (born December 28, 1958) is an American professional golfer who has played on the PGA Tour and the Nationwide Tour. He is the older brother of PGA Tour golfer Tom Byrum.

Byrum was born and raised in Onida, South Dakota. He learned to play golf on a nine-hole course that he and brother Tom used to mow. He was an exceptionally talented athlete in high school in both football and basketball. Byrum attended the University of New Mexico and was a member of the golf team. He turned pro in 1982 and joined the PGA Tour in 1983.

Byrum has spent time playing on the PGA Tour and the Nationwide Tour. He has 19 top-10 finishes in PGA Tour events and 18 top-10 finishes in Nationwide Tour events. Like his brother, he won once on the PGA Tour; and also like his brother, that win came in 1989. He won twice on the Nationwide Tour. His best finish in a major is T-14 at the 1987 PGA Championship. Late in his career, Byrum began experiencing orthopedic ailments which limited his playing time; he had surgery on his right elbow in 1992 and 1996.

Since 2001, Byrum has worked with The Golf Channel as an analyst. He lives in Scottsdale, Arizona.

Byrum made his Champions Tour debut in 2009 but has played only six events.

Amateur wins (6)
1976 South Dakota Men's Stroke Play Championship
1979 South Dakota Men's Match Play Championship, South Dakota Men's Stroke Play Championship, Pacific Coast Amateur
1980 South Dakota Men's Stroke Play Championship
1982 Lake Macquarie Amateur

Professional wins (5)

PGA Tour wins (1)

Nike Tour wins (2)

Nike Tour playoff record (1–1)

Other wins (2)
1986 Showdown Classic (with Bobby Nichols, unofficial Senior PGA Tour event)
2009 Arizona Open

Results in major championships

Note: Byrum never played in The Open Championship.

CUT = missed the half-way cut
"T" = tied

See also
1982 PGA Tour Qualifying School graduates
1983 PGA Tour Qualifying School graduates
1993 Nike Tour graduates

References

External links

American male golfers
New Mexico Lobos men's golfers
PGA Tour golfers
PGA Tour Champions golfers
Golf writers and broadcasters
Korn Ferry Tour graduates
Golfers from South Dakota
Golfers from Scottsdale, Arizona
American sports announcers
People from Sully County, South Dakota
1958 births
Living people